North Branch Township is a civil township of Lapeer County in the U.S. state of Michigan. The population was 3,645 at the 2010 census. The Village of North Branch is located within the township.

Geography

Demographics
As of the census of 2010, there were 3,645 people, 1,189 households, and 939 families residing in the township. The racial makeup of the township was 97.13% White, 0.11% African American, 0.33% Native American, 0.14% Asian, 0.95% from other races, and 1.34% from two or more races. Hispanic or Latino of any race were 3.09% of the population.

There were 1,189 households, out of which 43.4% had children under the age of 18 living with them, 65.1% were married couples living together, 9.2% had a female householder with no husband present, and 21.0% were non-families. 18.6% of all households were made up of individuals, and 9.0% had someone living alone who was 65 years of age or older.  The average household size was 2.99 and the average family size was 3.39.

In the township the population was spread out, with 31.8% under the age of 18, 9.1% from 18 to 24, 28.7% from 25 to 44, 20.8% from 45 to 64, and 9.6% who were 65 years of age or older.  The median age was 33 years. For every 100 females, there were 101.0 males.  For every 100 females age 18 and over, there were 97.2 males.

The median income for a household in the township was $46,020, and the median income for a family was $51,378. Males had a median income of $41,438 versus $22,750 for females. The per capita income for the township was $16,972.  About 3.8% of families and 5.8% of the population were below the poverty line, including 5.9% of those under age 18 and 8.8% of those age 65 or over.

References

Townships in Lapeer County, Michigan
Townships in Michigan